GSY may refer to:
 Glycogen synthase
 goeasy, a Canadian financial services company
 Guernsey, Chapman code
 Guiseley railway station, in Leeds, England